Journal Press was  a weekly newspaper based in King George, Virginia covering King George and Wesmoreland Counties and the Town of Colonial Beach, Virginia. The newspaper's final edition was January 11, 2017.

References

Defunct newspapers published in Virginia
King George County, Virginia
Westmoreland County, Virginia